Saint Patrick (or) was a fifth-century Romano-British Christian missionary and bishop in Ireland. Known as the "Apostle of Ireland", he is the primary patron saint of Ireland, the other patron saints being Brigid of Kildare and Columba. Patrick was never formally canonised, having lived before the current laws of the Catholic Church in these matters. Nevertheless, he is venerated as a saint in the Catholic Church, the Lutheran Church, the Church of Ireland (part of the Anglican Communion), and in the Eastern Orthodox Church, where he is regarded as equal-to-the-apostles and Enlightener of Ireland.

The dates of Patrick's life cannot be fixed with certainty, but there is general agreement that he was active as a missionary in Ireland during the fifth century. A recent biography on Patrick shows a late fourth-century date for the saint is not impossible. According to tradition dating from the early Middle Ages, Patrick was the first bishop of Armagh and Primate of Ireland, and is credited with bringing Christianity to Ireland, converting a pagan society. He has been generally so regarded ever since, despite evidence of some earlier Christian presence. 

According to Patrick's autobiographical Confessio, when he was about sixteen, he was captured by Irish pirates from his home in Britain and taken as a slave to Ireland. He writes that he lived there for six years as an animal herder before escaping and returning to his family. After becoming a cleric, he returned to spread Christianity in northern and western Ireland. In later life, he served as a bishop, but little is known about where he worked. By the seventh century, he had already come to be revered as the patron saint of Ireland.

His feast day is observed on 17 March, the supposed date of his death. It is celebrated in Ireland and among the Irish diaspora as a religious and cultural holiday. In the dioceses of Ireland, it is both a solemnity and a holy day of obligation.

Sources
Two Latin works survive which are generally accepted as having been written by St. Patrick. These are the Declaration and the Letter to the soldiers of Coroticus, from which come the only generally accepted details of his life. The Declaration is the more biographical of the two. In it, Patrick gives a short account of his life and his mission. Most available details of his life are from subsequent hagiographies and annals, which have considerable value but lack the empiricism scholars depend on today.

Name

Hagiography records other names he is said to have borne. Tírechán's seventh-century Collectanea gives: "Magonus, that is, famous; Succetus, that is, god of war; Patricius, that is, father of the citizens; Cothirthiacus, because he served four houses of druids." "Magonus" appears in the ninth century Historia Brittonum as Maun, descending from British *Magunos, meaning "servant-lad". "Succetus", which also appears in Muirchú moccu Machtheni's seventh century Life as Sochet, is identified by Mac Neill as "a word of British origin meaning swineherd". Harvey argues that Cothraige "has the form of a classic Old Irish tribal (and therefore place-) name", noting that Ail Coithrigi is a name for the Rock of Cashel, and the place-names Cothrugu and Catrige are attested in Counties Antrim and Carlow.

Dating

The dates of Patrick's life are uncertain; there are conflicting traditions regarding the year of his death. His own writings provide no evidence for any dating more precise than the 5th century generally. His Biblical quotations are a mixture of the Old Latin version and the Vulgate, completed in the early 5th century, suggesting he was writing "at the point of transition from Old Latin to Vulgate", although it is possible the Vulgate readings may have been added later, replacing earlier readings. The Letter to Coroticus implies that the Franks were still pagans at the time of writing: their conversion to Christianity is dated to the period 496–508.

The Irish annals for the fifth century date Patrick's arrival in Ireland at 432, but they were compiled in the mid 6th century at the earliest. The date 432 was probably chosen to minimise the contribution of Palladius, who was known to have been sent to Ireland in 431, and maximise that of Patrick. A variety of dates are given for his death. In 457 "the elder Patrick" is said to have died: this may refer to the death of Palladius, who according to the Book of Armagh was also called Patrick. In 461/2 the annals say that "Here some record the repose of Patrick"; in 492/3 they record the death of "Patrick, the arch-apostle (or archbishop and apostle) of the Scoti", on 17 March, at the age of 120.

While some modern historians accept the earlier date of c. 460 for Patrick's death, scholars of early Irish history tend to prefer a later date, c. 493. Supporting the later date, the annals record that in 553 "the relics of Patrick were placed sixty years after his death in a shrine by Colum Cille" (emphasis added). The death of Patrick's disciple Mochta is dated in the annals to 535 or 537, and the early hagiographies "all bring Patrick into contact with persons whose obits occur at the end of the fifth century or the beginning of the sixth". However, E. A. Thompson argues that none of the dates given for Patrick's death in the Annals are reliable. A recent biography argues that a late fifth-century date for the saint is not impossible.

Life

Patrick was born at the end of Roman rule in Britain. His birthplace is not known with any certainty; some traditions place it in what is now England—one identifying it as Glannoventa (modern Ravenglass in Cumbria). In 1981, Thomas argued at length for the areas of Birdoswald, twenty miles (32 km) east of Carlisle on Hadrian's Wall. . In 1993, Paor glossed it as "[probably near] Carlisle". There is a Roman town known as Bannaventa in Northamptonshire, which is phonically similar to the Bannavem Taburniae mentioned in Patrick’s confession, but this is probably too far from the sea. Claims have also been advanced for locations in present-day Scotland, with the Catholic Encyclopedia stating that Patrick was born in Kilpatrick, Scotland, and in 1926 Eoin MacNeill also advanced a claim for South Wales.

Patrick's father, Calpurnius, is described as a decurion (Senator and tax collector) of an unspecified Romano-British city, and as a deacon; his grandfather Potitus was a priest from Bonaven Tabernia. However, Patrick's confession states he was not an active believer in his youth.

According to the Confession of Saint Patrick, at the age of sixteen he was captured by a group of Irish pirates, from his family's Villa at "Bannavem Taburniae". They took him to Ireland where he was enslaved and held captive for six years. Patrick writes in the Confession that the time he spent in captivity was critical to his spiritual development. He explains that the Lord had mercy on his youth and ignorance, and afforded him the opportunity to be forgiven his sins and convert to Christianity. While in captivity, he worked as a shepherd and strengthened his relationship with God through prayer, eventually leading him to convert to Christianity.

After six years of captivity he heard a voice telling him that he would soon go home, and then that his ship was ready. Fleeing his master, he travelled to a port, two hundred miles away, where he found a ship and with difficulty persuaded the captain to take him. After three days' sailing, they landed, presumably in Britain, and apparently all left the ship, walking for 28 days in a "wilderness" and becoming faint from hunger. Patrick's account of his escape from slavery and return home to Britain is recounted in his Declaration. After Patrick prayed for sustenance, they encountered a herd of wild boar; since this was shortly after Patrick had urged them to put their faith in God, his prestige in the group was greatly increased. After various adventures, he returned home to his family, now in his early twenties. After returning home to Britain, Patrick continued to study Christianity.

Patrick recounts that he had a vision a few years after returning home:I saw a man coming, as it were from Ireland. His name was Victoricus, and he carried many letters, and he gave me one of them. I read the heading: "The Voice of the Irish". As I began the letter, I imagined in that moment that I heard the voice of those very people who were near the wood of Foclut, which is beside the western sea—and they cried out, as with one voice: "We appeal to you, holy servant boy, to come and walk among us."

A.B.E. Hood suggests that the Victoricus of St. Patrick's vision may be identified with Saint Victricius, bishop of Rouen in the late fourth century, who had visited Britain in an official capacity in 396. However, Ludwig Bieler disagrees.

Patrick studied in Europe principally at Auxerre, but is thought to have visited the Marmoutier Abbey, Tours and to have received the tonsure at Lérins Abbey. Saint Germanus of Auxerre, a bishop of the Western Church, ordained him to the priesthood.

Acting on his vision, Patrick returned to Ireland as a Christian missionary. According to J. B. Bury, his landing place was Wicklow, Co. Wicklow, at the mouth of the river Inver-dea, which is now called the Vartry. Bury suggests that Wicklow was also the port through which Patrick made his escape after his six years' captivity, though he offers only circumstantial evidence to support this. Tradition has it that Patrick was not welcomed by the locals and was forced to leave and seek a more welcoming landing place further north. He rested for some days at the islands off the Skerries coast, one of which still retains the name of Inis-Patrick. The first sanctuary dedicated by Patrick was at Saul. Shortly thereafter Benin (or Benignus), son of the chieftain Secsnen, joined Patrick's group.

Much of the Declaration concerns charges made against Patrick by his fellow Christians at a trial. What these charges were, he does not say explicitly, but he writes that he returned the gifts which wealthy women gave him, did not accept payment for baptisms, nor for ordaining priests, and indeed paid for many gifts to kings and judges, and paid for the sons of chiefs to accompany him. It is concluded, therefore, that he was accused of some sort of financial impropriety, and perhaps of having obtained his bishopric in Ireland with personal gain in mind.

The condemnation might have contributed to his decision to return to Ireland. According to Patrick's most recent biographer, Roy Flechner, the Confessio was written in part as a defence against his detractors, who did not believe that he was taken to Ireland as a slave, despite Patrick's vigorous insistence that he was. Patrick eventually returned to Ireland, probably settling in the west of the island, where, in later life, he became a bishop and ordained subordinate clerics.

From this same evidence, something can be seen of Patrick's mission. He writes that he "baptised thousands of people", even planning to convert his slavers. He ordained priests to lead the new Christian communities. He converted wealthy women, some of whom became nuns in the face of family opposition. He also dealt with the sons of kings, converting them too. The Confessio is generally vague about the details of his work in Ireland, though giving some specific instances. This is partly because, as he says at points, he was writing for a local audience of Christians who knew him and his work. There are several mentions of travelling around the island, and of sometimes difficult interactions with the ruling elite. He does claim of the Irish: Never before did they know of God except to serve idols and unclean things. But now, they have become the people of the Lord, and are called children of God. The sons and daughters of the leaders of the Irish are seen to be monks and virgins of Christ! Patrick's position as a foreigner in Ireland was not an easy one. His refusal to accept gifts from kings placed him outside the normal ties of kinship, fosterage and affinity. Legally he was without protection, and he says that he was on one occasion beaten, robbed of all he had, and put in chains, perhaps awaiting execution. Patrick says that he was also "many years later" a captive for 60 days, without giving details.

Murchiú's life of Saint Patrick contains a supposed prophecy by the druids which gives an impression of how Patrick and other Christian missionaries were seen by those hostile to them:

Across the sea will come Adze-head, crazed in the head,
his cloak with hole for the head, his stick bent in the head.
He will chant impieties from a table in the front of his house;
all his people will answer: "so be it, so be it."

The second piece of evidence that comes from Patrick's life is the Letter to Coroticus or Letter to the Soldiers of Coroticus, written after a first remonstrance was received with ridicule and insult. In this, Patrick writes an open letter announcing that he has excommunicated Coroticus because he had taken some of Patrick's converts into slavery while raiding in Ireland. The letter describes the followers of Coroticus as "fellow citizens of the devils" and "associates of the Scots [of Dalriada and later Argyll] and Apostate Picts". Based largely on an eighth-century gloss, Coroticus is taken to be King Ceretic of Alt Clut. Thompson however proposed that based on the evidence it is more likely that Coroticus was a British Roman living in Ireland. It has been suggested that it was the sending of this letter which provoked the trial which Patrick mentions in the Confession.

Seventh-century writings
An early document which is silent concerning Patrick is the letter of Columbanus to Pope Boniface IV of about 613. Columbanus writes that Ireland's Christianity "was first handed to us by you, the successors of the holy apostles", apparently referring to Palladius only, and ignoring Patrick. Writing on the Easter controversy in 632 or 633, Cummian—it is uncertain whether this is Cumméne Fota, associated with Clonfert, or Cumméne Find—does refer to Patrick, calling him "our papa"; that is, pope or primate.

Two works by late seventh-century hagiographers of Patrick have survived. These are the writings of Tírechán and the Vita sancti Patricii of Muirchú moccu Machtheni. Both writers relied upon an earlier work, now lost, the Book of Ultán. This Ultán, probably the same person as Ultan of Ardbraccan, was Tírechán's foster-father. His obituary is given in the Annals of Ulster under the year 657. These works thus date from a century and a half after Patrick's death.

Tírechán writes, "I found four names for Patrick written in the book of Ultán, bishop of the tribe of Conchobar: holy Magonus (that is, "famous"); Succetus (that is, the god of war); Patricius (that is, father of the citizens); Cothirtiacus (because he served four houses of druids)."

Muirchu records much the same information, adding that "[h]is mother was named Concessa". The name Cothirtiacus, however, is simply the Latinised form of Old Irish Cothraige, which is the Q-Celtic form of Latin Patricius.

The Patrick portrayed by Tírechán and Muirchu is a martial figure, who contests with druids, overthrows pagan idols, and curses kings and kingdoms. On occasion, their accounts contradict Patrick's own writings: Tírechán states that Patrick accepted gifts from female converts although Patrick himself flatly denies this. However, the emphasis Tírechán and Muirchu placed on female converts, and in particular royal and noble women who became nuns, is thought to be a genuine insight into Patrick's work of conversion. Patrick also worked with the unfree and the poor, encouraging them to vows of monastic chastity. Tírechán's account suggests that many early Patrician churches were combined with nunneries founded by Patrick's noble female converts.

The martial Patrick found in Tírechán and Muirchu, and in later accounts, echoes similar figures found during the conversion of the Roman Empire to Christianity. It may be doubted whether such accounts are an accurate representation of Patrick's time, although such violent events may well have occurred as Christians gained in strength and numbers.

Much of the detail supplied by Tírechán and Muirchu, in particular the churches established by Patrick, and the monasteries founded by his converts, may relate to the situation in the seventh century, when the churches which claimed ties to Patrick, and in particular Armagh, were expanding their influence throughout Ireland in competition with the church of Kildare. In the same period, Wilfred, Archbishop of York, claimed to speak, as metropolitan archbishop, "for all the northern part of Britain and of Ireland" at a council held in Rome in the time of Pope Agatho, thus claiming jurisdiction over the Irish church.

Other presumed early materials include the Irish annals, which contain records from the Chronicle of Ireland. These sources have conflated Palladius and Patrick. Another early document is the so-called First Synod of Saint Patrick. This is a seventh-century document, once, but no longer, taken as to contain a fifth-century original text. It apparently collects the results of several early synods, and represents an era when pagans were still a major force in Ireland. The introduction attributes it to Patrick, Auxilius, and Iserninus, a claim which "cannot be taken at face value."

Legends

Patrick uses shamrock in an illustrative parable

Legend credits Patrick with teaching the Irish about the doctrine of the Holy Trinity by showing people the shamrock, a three-leafed plant, using it to illustrate the Christian teaching of three persons in one God. The earliest written version of the story is given by the botanist Caleb Threlkeld in his 1726 Synopsis stirpium Hibernicarum, but the earliest surviving records associating Patrick with the plant are coins depicting Patrick clutching a shamrock which were minted in the 1680s.

In pagan Ireland, three was a significant number and the Irish had many triple deities, a fact that may have aided Patrick in his evangelisation efforts when he "held up a shamrock and discoursed on the Christian Trinity". Patricia Monaghan says there is no evidence that the shamrock was sacred to the pagan Irish. However, Jack Santino speculates that it may have represented the regenerative powers of nature, and was recast in a Christian context. Icons of St Patrick often depict the saint "with a cross in one hand and a sprig of shamrocks in the other". Roger Homan writes, "We can perhaps see St Patrick drawing upon the visual concept of the triskele when he uses the shamrock to explain the Trinity".

Patrick banishes snakes from Ireland

Ireland was well-known to be a land without snakes, and this was noted as early as the third century by Gaius Julius Solinus, but later legend credited Patrick with banishing snakes from the island. The earliest text to mention an Irish saint banishing snakes from Ireland is in fact the Life of Saint Columba (chapter 3.23), written in the late seventh or early eighth century. Gerald of Wales also mentions the story in the early thirteenth century, but he is doubtful of its truthfulness. The hagiographic theme of banishing snakes may draw on the Biblical account of the staff of the prophet Moses. In , Moses and Aaron use their staffs in their struggle with Pharaoh's sorcerers, the staffs of each side turning into snakes. Aaron's snake-staff prevails by consuming the other snakes.

Post-glacial Ireland never had snakes. "At no time has there ever been any suggestion of snakes in Ireland, so [there was] nothing for St. Patrick to banish", says naturalist Nigel Monaghan, keeper of natural history at the National Museum of Ireland in Dublin, who has searched extensively through Irish fossil collections and records.

Patrick's fast on the mountain
Tírechán wrote in the 7th century that Patrick spent forty days on the mountaintop of Cruachán Aigle, as Moses did on Mount Sinai. The 9th century Bethu Phátraic says that Patrick was harassed by a flock of black demonic birds while on the peak, and he banished them into the hollow of Lugnademon ("hollow of the demons") by ringing his bell. Patrick ended his fast when God gave him the right to judge all the Irish at the Last Judgement, and agreed to spare the land of Ireland from the final desolation. A later legend tells how Patrick was tormented on the mountain by a demonic female serpent named Corra or Caorthannach. Patrick is said to have banished the serpent into Lough Na Corra below the mountain, or into a hollow from which the lake burst forth. The mountain is now known as Croagh Patrick (Cruach Phádraig) after the saint.

Patrick and Dáire
According to tradition, Patrick founded his main church at Armagh (Ard Mhacha) in the year 445. Muirchú writes that a pagan chieftain named Dáire would not let Patrick build a church on the hill of Ard Mhacha, but instead gave him lower ground to the east. One day, Dáire's horses die after grazing on the church land. He tells his men to kill Patrick, but is himself struck down with illness. Dáire's men beg Patrick to heal him, and Patrick's holy water revives both Dáire and his horses. Dáire rewards Patrick with a great bronze cauldron and gave him the hill of Ard Mhacha to build a church, which eventually became the head church of Ireland. Dáire has similarities with the Dagda, an Irish god who owns a cauldron of plenty.

In a later legend, the pagan chieftain is named Crom. Patrick asks the chieftain for food, and Crom sends his bull, in the hope that it will drive off or kill Patrick. Instead, it meekly submits to Patrick, allowing itself to be slaughtered and eaten. Crom demands his bull be returned. Patrick has the bull's bones and hide put together and brings it back to life. In some versions, Crom is so impressed that he converts to Christianity, while in others he is killed by the bull. In parts of Ireland, Lughnasa (1 August) is called 'Crom's Sunday' and the legend could recall bull sacrifices during the festival.

Patrick speaks with ancient Irish ancestors
The twelfth-century work Acallam na Senórach tells of Patrick being met by two ancient warriors, Caílte mac Rónáin and Oisín, during his evangelical travels. The two were once members of Fionn mac Cumhaill's warrior band the Fianna, and somehow survived to Patrick's time. In the work St. Patrick seeks to convert the warriors to Christianity, while they defend their pagan past. The heroic pagan lifestyle of the warriors, of fighting and feasting and living close to nature, is contrasted with the more peaceful, but unheroic and non-sensual life offered by Christianity.

Patrick and the innkeeper
A much later legend tells of Patrick visiting an inn and chiding the innkeeper for being ungenerous with her guests. Patrick tells her that a demon is hiding in her cellar and being fattened by her dishonesty. He says that the only way to get rid of the demon is by mending her ways. Some time later, Patrick revisits the inn to find that the innkeeper is now serving her guests cups of whiskey filled to the brim. He praises her generosity and brings her to the cellar, where they find the demon withering away. It then flees in a flash of flame, and Patrick decrees that people should have a drink of whiskey on his feast day in memory of this. This is said to be the origin of "drowning the shamrock" on Saint Patrick's Day.

Battle for the Body of St Patrick
According to the Annals of the Four Masters, an early-modern compilation of earlier annals, his corpse soon became an object of conflict in the Battle for the Body of Saint Patrick:

Modern theories

"Two Patricks" theory

Irish academic T. F. O'Rahilly proposed the "Two Patricks" theory, which suggests that many of the traditions later attached to Saint Patrick actually concerned the aforementioned Palladius, who, according to Prosper of Aquitaine's Chronicle, was sent by Pope Celestine I as the first bishop to Irish Christians in 431. Palladius was not the only early cleric in Ireland at this time. The Irish-born Saint Ciarán of Saigir lived in the later fourth century (352–402) and was the first bishop of Ossory. Ciaran, along with saints Auxilius, Secundinus and Iserninus, is also associated with early churches in Munster and Leinster. By this reading, Palladius was active in Ireland until the 460s.

Prosper associates Palladius' appointment with the visits of Germanus of Auxerre to Britain to suppress Pelagianism and it has been suggested that Palladius and his colleagues were sent to Ireland to ensure that exiled Pelagians did not establish themselves among the Irish Christians. The appointment of Palladius and his fellow-bishops was not obviously a mission to convert the Irish, but more probably intended to minister to existing Christian communities in Ireland. The sites of churches associated with Palladius and his colleagues are close to royal centres of the period: Secundus is remembered by Dunshaughlin, County Meath, close to the Hill of Tara which is associated with the High King of Ireland; Killashee, County Kildare, close to Naas with links with the kings of Leinster, is probably named for Auxilius. This activity was limited to the southern half of Ireland, and there is no evidence for them in Ulster or Connacht.

Although the evidence for contacts with Gaul is clear, the borrowings from Latin into Old Irish show that links with Roman Britain were many. Iserninus, who appears to be of the generation of Palladius, is thought to have been a Briton, and is associated with the lands of the Uí Ceinnselaig in Leinster. The Palladian mission should not be contrasted with later "British" missions, but forms a part of them; nor can the work of Palladius be uncritically equated with that of Saint Patrick, as was once traditional.

Abduction reinterpreted

According to Patrick's own account, it was Irish raiders who brought him to Ireland where he was enslaved and held captive for six years. However, a recent alternative interpretation of Patrick's departure to Ireland suggests that, as the son of a decurion, he would have been obliged by Roman law to serve on the town council (curia), but chose instead to abscond from the onerous obligations of this office by fleeing abroad, as many others in his position had done in what has become known as the 'flight of the curiales'. Roy Flechner also asserts the improbability of an escape from servitude and journey of the kind that Patrick purports to have undertaken. He also interprets the biblical allusions in Patrick's account (e.g. the theme of freedom after six years of servitude in Exod. 21:2 or Jer. 34:14), as implying parts of the account may not have been intended to be understood literally.

Sainthood and veneration

17 March, popularly known as Saint Patrick's Day, is believed to be his death date and is the date celebrated as his Feast Day. The day became a feast day in the Catholic Church due to the influence of the Waterford-born Franciscan scholar Luke Wadding, as a member of the commission for the reform of the Breviary in the early part of the 17th century.

For most of Christianity's first thousand years, canonisations were done on the diocesan or regional level. Relatively soon after the death of people considered very holy, the local Church affirmed that they could be liturgically celebrated as saints. As a result, Patrick has never been formally canonised by a pope (common before the Great Schism of 1054, and in the Orthodox Church which never innovated a formal canonisation process and has always lacked a Supreme Pontiff); nevertheless, various Christian churches declare that he is a saint in Heaven (see List of Saints). He is still widely venerated in Ireland and elsewhere today.

Patrick is honoured with a feast day on the liturgical calendar of the Episcopal Church (USA) and with a commemoration on the calendar of Evangelical Lutheran Worship, both on 17 March. Patrick is also venerated in the Eastern Orthodox Church as a pre-Schism Western saint, especially among Orthodox Christians living in Ireland and the Anglosphere; as is usual with saints, there are Orthodox icons dedicated to him.

Saint Patrick remains a recurring figure in Folk Christianity and Irish folktales.

Patrick is said to be buried at Down Cathedral in Downpatrick, County Down, alongside Saint Brigid and Saint Columba, although this has never been proven. Saint Patrick Visitor Centre is a modern exhibition complex located in Downpatrick and is a permanent interpretative exhibition centre featuring interactive displays on the life and story of Patrick. It provides the only permanent exhibition centre in the world devoted to Patrick.

Patrick is remembered in the Church of England with a Lesser Festival on 17 March.

Saint Patrick's Breastplate

Saint Patrick's Breastplate is a lorica, or hymn, which is attributed to Patrick during his Irish ministry in the 5th century.

Saint Patrick's crosses

There are two main types of crosses associated with Patrick, the cross pattée and the Saltire. The cross pattée is the more traditional association, while the association with the saltire dates from 1783 and the Order of St. Patrick.

The cross pattée has long been associated with Patrick, for reasons that are uncertain. One possible reason is that bishops' mitres in Ecclesiastical heraldry often appear surmounted by a cross pattée. An example of this can be seen on the old crest of the Brothers of St. Patrick. As Patrick was the founding bishop of the Irish church, the symbol may have become associated with him. Patrick is traditionally portrayed in the vestments of a bishop, and his mitre and garments are often decorated with a cross pattée.

The cross pattée retains its link to Patrick to the present day. For example, it appears on the coat of arms of both the Roman Catholic Archdiocese of Armagh and the Church of Ireland Archdiocese of Armagh. This is on account of Patrick being regarded as the first bishop of the Diocese of Armagh. It is also used by Down District Council which has its headquarters in Downpatrick, the reputed burial place of Patrick.

Saint Patrick's Saltire is a red saltire on a white field. It is used in the insignia of the Order of Saint Patrick, established in 1783, and after the Acts of Union 1800 it was combined with the Saint George's Cross of England and the Saint Andrew's Cross of Scotland to form the Union Flag of the United Kingdom of Great Britain and Ireland. A saltire was intermittently used as a symbol of Ireland from the seventeenth century, but without reference to Patrick.

It was formerly a common custom to wear a cross made of paper or ribbon on St Patrick's Day. Surviving examples of such badges come in many colours and they were worn upright rather than as saltires.

Thomas Dinely, an English traveller in Ireland in 1681, remarked that "the Irish of all stations and condicõns were crosses in their hatts, some of pins, some of green ribbon." Jonathan Swift, writing to "Stella" of Saint Patrick's Day 1713, said "the Mall was so full of crosses that I thought all the world was Irish". In the 1740s, the badges pinned were multicoloured interlaced fabric. In the 1820s, they were only worn by children, with simple multicoloured daisy patterns. In the 1890s, they were almost extinct, and a simple green Greek cross inscribed in a circle of paper (similar to the Ballina crest pictured). The Irish Times in 1935 reported they were still sold in poorer parts of Dublin, but fewer than those of previous years "some in velvet or embroidered silk or poplin, with the gold paper cross entwined with shamrocks and ribbons".

Saint Patrick's Bell

The National Museum of Ireland in Dublin possesses a bell first mentioned, according to the Annals of Ulster, in the Book of Cuanu in the year 552. The bell was part of a collection of "relics of Patrick" removed from his tomb sixty years after his death by Colum Cille to be used as relics. The bell is described as "The Bell of the Testament", one of three relics of "precious minna" (extremely valuable items), of which the other two are described as Patrick's goblet and "The Angels Gospel". Colum Cille is described to have been under the direction of an "Angel" for whom he sent the goblet to Down, the bell to Armagh, and kept possession of the Angel's Gospel for himself. The name Angels Gospel is given to the book because it was supposed that Colum Cille received it from the angel's hand. A stir was caused in 1044 when two kings, in some dispute over the bell, went on spates of prisoner taking and cattle theft. The annals make one more apparent reference to the bell when chronicling a death, of 1356: "Solomon Ua Mellain, The Keeper of The Bell of the Testament, protector, rested in Christ."

The bell was encased in a "bell shrine", a distinctive Irish type of reliquary made for it, as an inscription records, by King Domnall Ua Lochlainn sometime between 1091 and 1105. The shrine is an important example of the final, Viking-influenced, style of Irish Celtic art, with intricate Urnes style decoration in gold and silver. The Gaelic inscription on the shrine also records the name of the maker "U INMAINEN" (which translates to "Noonan"), "who with his sons enriched/decorated it"; metalwork was often inscribed for remembrance.

The bell itself is simple in design, hammered into shape with a small handle fixed to the top with rivets. Originally forged from iron, it has since been coated in bronze. The shrine is inscribed with three names, including King Domnall Ua Lochlainn's. The rear of the shrine, not intended to be seen, is decorated with crosses while the handle is decorated with, among other work, Celtic designs of birds. The bell is accredited with working a miracle in 1044, and having been coated in bronze to shield it from human eyes, for which it would be too holy. It measures 12.5 × 10 cm at the base, 12.8 × 4 cm at the shoulder, 16.5 cm from base to shoulder, 3.3 cm from shoulder to top of handle and weighs 1.7 kg.

Saint Patrick and Irish identity

Patrick features in many stories in the Irish oral tradition and there are many customs connected with his feast day. The folklorist Jenny Butler discusses how these traditions have been given new layers of meaning over time while also becoming tied to Irish identity both in Ireland and abroad. The symbolic resonance of the Saint Patrick figure is complex and multifaceted, stretching from that of Christianity's arrival in Ireland to an identity that encompasses everything Irish. In some portrayals, the saint is symbolically synonymous with the Christian religion itself. There is also evidence of a combination of indigenous religious traditions with that of Christianity, which places St Patrick in the wider framework of cultural hybridity. Popular religious expression has this characteristic feature of merging elements of culture. Later in time, the saint becomes associated specifically with Catholic Ireland and synonymously with Irish national identity. Subsequently, Saint Patrick is a patriotic symbol along with the colour green and the shamrock. Saint Patrick's Day celebrations include many traditions that are known to be relatively recent historically, but have endured through time because of their association either with religious or national identity. They have persisted in such a way that they have become stalwart traditions, viewed as the strongest "Irish traditions".

Places associated with Saint Patrick

 Slemish, County Antrim and Killala Bay, County Mayo
When captured by raiders, there are two theories as to where Patrick was enslaved. One theory is that he herded sheep in the countryside around Slemish. Another theory is that Patrick herded sheep near Killala Bay, at a place called Fochill.
 Glastonbury Abbey, Somerset, UK
It is claimed that he was buried within the Abbey grounds next to the high altar, which has led to many believing this is why Glastonbury was popular among Irish pilgrims. It is also believed that he was 'the founder and the first Abbot of Glastonbury Abbey.'  This was recorded by William of Malmesbury in his document "De antiquitate Glastoniensis ecclesiae (Concerning the Antiquity of Glastonbury)" that was compiled between 1129 and 1135, where it was noted that "After converting the Irish and establishing them solidly in the Catholic faith he returned to his native land, and was led by guidance from on high to Glastonbury. There he came upon certain holy men living the life of hermits. Finding themselves all of one mind with Patrick they decided to form a community, and elected him as their superior. Later, two of their members resided on the Tor to serve its Chapel." Within the grounds of the Abbey lies St. Patrick's Chapel, Glastonbury which is a site of pilgrimage to this day. The well known Irish Scholar James Carney also elaborated on this claim and wrote "it is possible that Patrick, tired and ill at the end of his arduous mission felt released from his vow not to leave Ireland, and returned to the monastery from which he had come, which might have been Glastonbury". It is also another  possible burial site of the saint, where it is documented he has been "interred in the Old Wattle Church".
 Saul Monastery
It is claimed that Patrick founded his first church in a barn at Saul, which was donated to him by a local chieftain called Dichu. It is also claimed that Patrick died at Saul or was brought there between his death and burial. Nearby, on the crest of Slieve Patrick, is a huge statue of Patrick with bronze panels showing scenes from his life.
 Hill of Slane, County Meath
Muirchu moccu Machtheni, in his highly mythologised seventh-century Life of Patrick, says that Patrick lit a Paschal fire on this hilltop in 433 in defiance of High King Laoire. The story says that the fire could not be doused by anyone but Patrick, and it was here that he explained the Holy Trinity using the shamrock.
 Croagh Patrick, County Mayo
It is claimed that Patrick climbed this mountain and fasted on its summit for the forty days of Lent. Croagh Patrick draws thousands of pilgrims who make the trek to the top on the last Sunday in July.
 Lough Derg, County Donegal
It is claimed that Patrick killed a large serpent on this lake and that its blood turned the water red (hence the name). Each August, pilgrims spend three days fasting and praying there on Station Island.
 Armagh, County Armagh
It is claimed that Patrick founded a church here and proclaimed it to be the most holy church in Ireland. Armagh is today the primary seat of both the Catholic Church in Ireland and the Church of Ireland, and both cathedrals in the town are named after Patrick.
 Downpatrick, County Down
It is claimed that Patrick was brought here after his death and buried in the grounds of Down Cathedral.

Other places named after Saint Patrick include:
 Patrickswell Lane, a well in Drogheda Town where St. Patrick opened a monastery and baptised the townspeople.
 Ardpatrick, County Limerick
 Patrick Water (Old Patrick Water), Elderslie, Renfrewshire. from Scots' Gaelic "AlltPadraig" meaning Patrick's Burn
 Patrickswell or Toberpatrick, County Limerick
 St Patrick's Well, Patterdale
 Three churches in the Diocese of Carlisle are dedicated to St Patrick, they are all within the historic county of Westmorland: St Patrick's Patterdale, at the head of Ullswater (the present church was built in the 19th Century but the chapel in Patricksdale is mentioned in a charter of 1348); St Patrick's Bampton, near Shap; St Patrick's Preston Patrick near Kirkby Lonsdale.
 St Patrick's Chapel, Heysham, a ruined chapel near St Peter's Church, Heysham, Lancashire. The chapel dates from the 8th Century.
 St Patrick's Island, County Dublin
 Old Kilpatrick, near Dumbarton, Scotland from "Cill Phàdraig," Patrick's Church, a claimant to his birthplace
 St Patrick's Isle, off the Isle of Man
 St. Patricks, Newfoundland and Labrador, a community in the Baie Verte district of Newfoundland
 Llanbadrig (church), Ynys Badrig (island), Porth Padrig (cove), Llyn Padrig (lake), and Rhosbadrig (heath) on the island of Anglesey in Wales
 Templepatrick, County Antrim
 St Patrick's Hill, Liverpool, on old maps of the town near to the former location of "St Patrick's Cross"
 Parroquia San Patricio y Espiritu Santo. Loiza, Puerto Rico. The site was initially mentioned in 1645 as a chapel. The actual building was completed by 1729, is one of the oldest churches in the Americas and today represents the faith of many Irish immigrants that settled in Loiza by the end of the 18th century. Today it is a museum.

In literature
 Pedro Calderón de la Barca wrote El Purgatorio de San Patricio in 1634.
 Robert Southey wrote a ballad called "Saint Patrick's Purgatory", first published in 1798, based on popular legends surrounding the saint's name.
 Patrick is mentioned in a 17th-century ballad about "Saint George and the Dragon"
 Stephen R. Lawhead wrote the fictional Patrick: Son of Ireland loosely based on the saint's life, including imagined accounts of training as a druid and service in the Roman army before his conversion.
 The 1999 historical novel Let Me Die in Ireland by Anabaptist author and attorney David Bercot is based on the documented facts of Patrick's life rather than the legend, and suggests implications of his example for Christians today.

In film
 St. Patrick: The Irish Legend is a 2000 television historical drama film about the saint's life. Patrick is portrayed by Patrick Bergin.
 The Patron Saint of Ireland is a 2020 film based on Patrick's own writings and the earliest traditions. Patrick is portrayed by Seán Ó Meallaigh, with Robert McCormack playing him when he is younger and John Rhys-Davies in later life. It is available on Netflix in UK and Ireland.

See also
 List of Catholic saints
 Saint Mun
 Saint Patrick, patron saint archive
 Saint Urho
 St Patrick halfpenny
 St Patrick's blue
 St Patrick's Purgatory
 St Patrick's Rock

References

Works cited

Further reading

 
 
 
 
 
 
 Iannello, Fausto (2012), "Il modello paolino nell’Epistola ad milites Corotici di san Patrizio, Bollettino di Studi Latini 42/1: 43–63
 Iannello, Fausto (2013), "Notes and Considerations on the Importance of St. Patrick's Epistola ad Milites Corotici as a Source on the Origins of Celtic Christianity and Sub-Roman Britain". Imago Temporis. Medium Aevum 7 2013: 97–137

External links

 
 The Most Ancient Lives of Saint Patrick, edited by James O'Leary, 1880, from Project Gutenberg.
 
 
 St. Patrick's Confession and Epistola online from the Royal Irish Academy
 BBC: Religion & Ethics, Christianity: Saint Patrick (Incl. audio)
 Opera Omnia by Migne Patristica Latina with analytical indexes
 CELT : Corpus of Electronic Texts at University College Cork includes Patrick's Confessio and Epistola, as well as various lives of Saint Patrick.
 Saint Patrick's Confessio Hypertext Stack as published by the Royal Irish Academy Dictionary of Medieval Latin from Celtic Sources (DMLCS) freely providing digital scholarly editions of Saint Patrick's writings as well as translations and digital facsimiles of all extant manuscript copies.
 History Hub.ie: Saint Patrick – Historical Man and Popular Myth by Elva Johnston (University College Dublin)
 Saint Patrick Timeline | Church History Timelines

 
4th-century births
5th-century births
5th-century Irish bishops
5th-century Christian saints
5th-century deaths
5th-century Latin writers
Christian missionaries in Ireland
Medieval Irish saints
Medieval Irish writers
Medieval slaves
Northern Brythonic saints
Romano-British saints
Sub-Roman writers
Miracle workers
Writers of captivity narratives
Anglican saints